Monica Seles (born December 2, 1973) is a retired professional tennis player who represented Yugoslavia and the United States. A former world No. 1, she won nine Grand Slam singles titles, eight of them as a teenager while representing Yugoslavia, and the final one while representing the United States.

In 1990, Seles became the youngest-ever French Open champion at the age of 16. She went on to win eight Grand Slam singles titles before her 20th birthday and was the year-end No. 1 in 1991 and 1992. Seles did not return to tennis for over two years after the stabbing. Though she enjoyed some success after returning to tennis in 1995, including victory at the 1996 Australian Open, she was unable to consistently produce her best tennis. She played her last professional match at the 2003 French Open, but did not officially retire until February 2008.

Regarded by many as one of the greatest tennis players of all time, Seles was named one of the "30 Legends of Women's Tennis: Past, Present and Future" by Time. Several players and historians have stated that Seles had the potential to become the most accomplished female player of all time had she not been stabbed. She was inducted into the International Tennis Hall of Fame in 2009.

Early life and career
Seles was born in Yugoslavia to an ethnic Hungarian family. Her parents are Ester and Karolj (Eszter and Károly in Hungarian) and she has an older brother, Zoltán. She began playing tennis at age five, coached by her father, a professional cartoonist employed for decades at the Dnevnik and Magyar Szó newspapers, who drew pictures for her to make her tennis more fun. He is responsible for developing her two-handed style for both the forehand and backhand. Later, her coach was Jelena Genčić. In 1985, at the age of 11, she won the Junior Orange Bowl tournament in Miami, Florida, catching the attention of tennis coach Nick Bollettieri. In early 1986, Seles and her brother Zoltán moved from Yugoslavia to the United States, and Seles enrolled at the Nick Bollettieri Tennis Academy, where she trained for two years and continued to practice until March 1990. Nine months after their arrival at the Academy, Seles' mother and father joined her and Zoltán in Florida.

Seles played her first professional tournament as an amateur in 1988 at age 14. The following year she turned professional on February 13, 1989, and joined the professional tour full-time, winning her first career title at Houston in May 1989, where she beat the soon-to-retire Chris Evert in the final. A month later, Seles reached the semifinals of her first Grand Slam singles tournament at the French Open, losing to then-world no. 1 Steffi Graf. Seles finished her first year on the tour ranked world no. 6.

Tennis career

1990–1992
After a slow start at the beginning of the season, Seles went on a 36-match winning streak and won 6 consecutive tournaments starting in Miami at the Lipton Player's Championships. During that winning streak she also won the U.S. Hard Court Championships, the Eckerd Open, the Italian Open, and the Lufthansa Cup in Berlin, Germany (defeating Steffi Graf in the final in straight sets). Seles then won her first Grand Slam singles title at the 1990 French Open. Facing world no. 1 Steffi Graf in the final, Seles saved four set points in a first-set tiebreaker, which she won 8–6, and went on to take the match in straight sets. In doing so, she became the youngest-ever French Open singles Champion at the age of 16 years, 6 months. Her winning streak was stopped by Zina Garrison at Wimbledon in the quarterfinals, where Seles had a match point before Garrison eventually won 9–7 in the third set. Seles then won the Virginia Slims of Los Angeles title against Martina Navratilova and then defeated Navratilova again in winning the Oakland California tournament, in straight sets. She also won the 1990 year-end Virginia Slims Championships, defeating Gabriela Sabatini in five sets (in the first five-set women's match since the 1901 US National Championships), becoming the youngest to ever win the season-ending championships. She finished the year ranked world number 2.

1991 was the first of two years in which Seles dominated the women's tour. She started out by winning the Australian Open in January, beating Jana Novotná in the final. In March, she replaced Graf as the world no. 1. She then successfully defended her French Open title, beating the former youngest-ever winner, Arantxa Sánchez Vicario, in the final. Unable to play at Wimbledon, suffering from shin splints, Seles took a six-week break. But she was back in time for the US Open, which she won by beating Martina Navratilova in the final, her third Grand Slam title of the year, to cement her position at the top of the world rankings. She also won the year-end Virginia Slims Championships for the second consecutive time, defeating Navratilova in four sets. At the end of season, Seles had won 10 out of the 16 tournaments she entered (reaching the final of every tournament that she entered that year). She ended the year as the no. 1 ranked player in the world.

1992 was an equally dominant year. Seles successfully defended her titles at the Australian Open, the French Open, and the US Open. She also reached her first-ever final at Wimbledon, but lost to Graf. During Wimbledon, Seles encountered difficulty because of her habit of grunting or shrieking loudly when hitting shots. Her quarterfinal opponent Nathalie Tauziat was the first to complain to the chair umpire about it. During the third set of her semi-final match against Martina Navratilova, Navratilova also complained to the chair umpire about the grunting after Seles went up a break at 4–2. Seles ended up losing the game and the break, but broke back and closed out the match.

From January 1991 through February 1993, Seles won 22 titles and reached 33 finals out of the 34 tournaments she played. She compiled a 159–12 win–loss record (92.9% winning percentage), including a 55–1 win–loss record (98%) in Grand Slam tournaments. In the broader context of her first four years on the circuit (1989–1992), Seles had a win–loss record of 231–25 (90.2%) and collected 30 titles. She once again ended the year as the #1 ranked player in the world.

1993 stabbing attack
Seles was the top-ranked women's player heading into 1993, having won the French Open for three consecutive years and both the US Open and Australian Open in consecutive years. In January 1993, Seles defeated Graf in the final of the Australian Open, which, at that time, was her third win in four Grand Slam finals against Graf. She then won the Virginia Slims of Chicago over Martina Navratilova in three sets. This was the last title that Seles won before the attack in Hamburg, Germany.

On April 30, 1993 during a quarterfinal match against Magdalena Maleeva at the Citizen Cup in Hamburg, Germany, a German man named Günter Parche, an obsessed fan of Seles's rival, German player Steffi Graf, ran from the middle of the crowd to the edge of the court during a break between games and stabbed Seles with a boning knife between her shoulder blades, to a depth of 1.5 inches. She was quickly taken to a hospital. Her physical injuries took several weeks to heal, but she stayed away from competitive tennis for more than two years. Initially, there was speculation that the attack might have been politically motivated because Seles was from Yugoslavia. She was known to have received death threats in relation to the Yugoslav Wars. However, German authorities were quick to rule this out, describing her attacker as confused and possibly mentally disturbed. According to police, Parche intended to severely injure Seles so that she would be unable to play tennis and Graf would become the world No. 1 player again.

Parche was charged following the incident, but spent less than 6 months in pre-trial detention. In his trial, he was found to be psychologically abnormal, and was sentenced to two years' probation and psychological treatment. The incident prompted a significant increase in the level of security at tennis tour events. At that year's Wimbledon, the players' seats were positioned with their backs to the umpire's chair, rather than the spectators. Seles, however, disputed the effectiveness of these measures. She was quoted in 2011 as saying, "From the time I was stabbed, I think the security hasn't changed". Seles vowed never to play tennis in Germany again, disenchanted by the German legal system. "What people seem to be forgetting is that this man stabbed me intentionally and he did not serve any sort of punishment for it ... I would not feel comfortable going back. I don't foresee that happening." In a later article, Tennis.com reported that Parche was living in nursing homes due to additional health problems.

Graf purportedly visited Seles while she was hospitalized. Young Elders, a band from Melbourne, Australia, sent their song called "Fly Monica Fly" to Seles while she was recuperating from the stabbing incident. She later said that the song provided inspiration to her at that time, and subsequently met the band (who later changed their name to the Monicas) following her victory at the Australian Open in 1996. The stabbing incident is the subject of Dan Bern's 1998 tribute to Seles, "Monica". Additionally, American band Majesty Crush paid tribute with "Seles" from the 1993 album Love-15.

The WTA suggested that Seles's No. 1 ranking be preserved due to her absence from the stabbing, but the ranking was ultimately not preserved. According to Seles's autobiography, all active tour players opposed the idea of preserving her number one ranking, except Gabriela Sabatini who abstained, voting neither yes or no. A vote was held at a tournament in Rome in 1993, and 16 of the 17 top players who voted rejected the proposal – Graf did not participate in the tournament and was thus absent from voting. Of those who did vote, only Sabatini did not reject the idea of freezing Seles's ranking until her return, but she did abstain. Seles did not play tennis for two years and suffered from depression as well as an eating disorder as a result of the attack.

Comeback
After becoming a U.S. citizen in 1994, Seles returned to the tour in August 1995. In the run-up to her comeback, then-WTA president Martina Navratilova proposed that Seles be reinstated alongside Steffi Graf as joint number one. The WTA did so despite some opposition from players including Arantxa Sánchez Vicario and Gigi Fernández, whose tournament placements would suffer greatly by suddenly being placed behind Seles. Graf supported Seles' co-ranking, but not the additional proposal that Seles' co-ranking not be determined by the minimum participation of 12 tournaments a year required of everyone else. Graf felt that would give Seles an unfair advantage in the rankings. Seles won her first comeback tournament, the Canadian Open, beating Amanda Coetzer in the final and setting a tournament record for the fewest games dropped by the champion throughout the tournament (14).

The following month at the US Open, Seles reached the final defeating world No.10 Anke Huber, No. 4 Jana Novotná, and No. 3 Conchita Martínez (all in straight sets), but lost to Graf in the final.

In January 1996, Seles won her fourth Australian Open, beating Anke Huber in the final. Her pivotal match was the semifinal vs rising American star Chanda Rubin who led her 5–2 in the final set, and had 2 break points to lead 5–1. Seles came back from 2 points from defeat to triumph and reach the final. This was to be Seles' last Grand Slam title, as she struggled to recapture her best form on a consistent basis. Seles was the runner-up at the US Open to Steffi Graf again in 1996. Seles' last Grand Slam final came at the French Open in 1998, just a few weeks after the death of her father and former coach, Karolj, from cancer. In the run to the final she had defeated world no. 3 Jana Novotná in three sets and world no. 1 Martina Hingis in straight sets, but lost to Sánchez Vicario in the three-set final.

While she did not reach another Grand Slam singles final, she did consistently reach the quarterfinal and semifinal stages in those tournaments and was a fixture in the WTA Tour's top 10. In 2002, her last full year on the tour, she finished the year ranked world no. 7, defeated Venus Williams, Martina Hingis, Jennifer Capriati, Justine Henin, Maria Sharapova, Kim Clijsters, and Lindsay Davenport, and reached at least the quarterfinals at each Grand Slam tournament.

Seles competed at the 1996 Olympic Games in Atlanta, where she beat Sabatini in a third round match before losing to Jana Novotná in the quarterfinals. Four years later, at the 2000 Olympic Games in Sydney, Seles captured her first Olympic medal, a bronze in singles. She defeated Jelena Dokic in the bronze medal match, after pushing eventual gold medalist Venus Williams to a tough 3 setter in the semis, losing 6–3 in the final set.

Seles helped the U.S. team win the Fed Cup in 1996, 1999, and 2000.

Hiatus and retirement

In the spring of 2003, Seles sustained a foot injury. She was forced to withdraw during the second set of a match against Nadia Petrova at the Italian Open. Then, a couple of weeks later and still injured, she lost in straight sets to the same player in the first round of the 2003 French Open. It was the only time she ever lost a first-round match at a Grand Slam. She never again played an official tour match.

In February 2005, Seles played two exhibition matches in New Zealand against Navratilova. Despite losing both matches, she played competitively and announced that she could return to the game early in 2006; however, she did not do so. She played three exhibition matches against Navratilova in 2007. On April 5, she defeated Navratilova in Houston, Texas, on clay. On September 14, Seles defeated Navratilova on an indoor court in New Orleans, Louisiana. On September 16, she beat her on clay in Bucharest.

In December 2007, Seles told the press that Lindsay Davenport's successful return to the tour had inspired her to consider her own limited comeback to play Grand Slam tournaments and the major warm-up events for those tournaments. However, on February 14, 2008, Seles announced her official retirement from professional tennis.

In January 2009, Seles was elected to the International Tennis Hall of Fame.

Assessment

Seles is widely regarded as one of the greatest tennis players of all time. In 2012, Tennis Channel created a list of the 100 greatest tennis players. Seles was listed at #19.

Seles won eight Grand Slam titles during her teenage years. However, her career was greatly affected by the stabbing incident. Some involved with the sport have declared that Seles could have become the most accomplished female player ever. In an article written 20 years after Seles was stabbed, Jonathan Scott of Tennis.com stated, "Would Monica Seles have been the greatest female tennis player ever? The world will never know." In a 2013 interview, Martina Navratilova theorized that if Seles had not been stabbed, "We'd be talking about Monica with the most Grand Slam titles [ahead of] Margaret Court or Steffi Graf." Mary Joe Fernandez declared that Seles would have at least doubled her Grand Slam championship tally, had she not been attacked. Tim Adams of The Guardian stated that Seles would have become "the greatest female tennis player ever to pick up a racket."

During the height of her career (the 1990 French Open through the 1993 Australian Open), she won eight of the 11 Grand Slam singles tournaments she contested. With eight Grand Slam singles titles before her 20th birthday, Seles holds the record for most Grand Slam singles titles won as a teenager in the Open Era.

Until her loss to Martina Hingis at the 1999 Australian Open, Seles had a perfect record at the event (33–0), which is the longest undefeated streak for this tournament (although Margaret Court won 38 consecutive matches there from 1960 to 1968 after losing a match in 1959). It also marked her first defeat in Australia, having won the Sydney tournament in 1996.

Seles was the first female tennis player to win her first six Grand Slam singles finals: 1990 French Open, 1991 Australian Open, 1991 French Open, 1991 US Open, 1992 Australian Open, and 1992 French Open. Seles was also the first female player since Hilde Krahwinkel Sperling in 1937 to win the women's singles title three consecutive years at the French Open, a feat subsequently achieved by Justine Henin in 2005–7. (Also, Chris Evert won the title in four consecutive appearances in 1974, 1975, 1979, and 1980).

Shortly after her retirement, Sports Illustrated writer Jon Wertheim summed up her later career:

She was inducted into the International Tennis Hall of Fame on July 11, 2009. In 2011, Seles was named one of the "30 Legends of Women's Tennis: Past, Present and Future" by Time.

Playing style
Seles was a baseline player who was known for her highly aggressive playing style. Her unconventional double-handed forehand and backhand were both hit flat, with relentless speed, power, and depth. As a result of her two-handed groundstrokes, she could create sharp angles around the court, and hit winners at will. She was an aggressive return player, and would stand within the baseline to return serves. Her serve speed peaked at 109 mph (174 km/h), allowing her to dictate points from the first stroke. Further strengths included her fitness, speed, and court coverage, allowing her to be an excellent retriever, and hit winners from any position on the court. Prior to her stabbing, Seles’ greatest strength was her confidence, self-belief, and mental toughness, with her being described as one of the toughest players to beat on the WTA tour. Following her return to the tour, she became a more tentative player, who was nowhere near as confident as she was prior to her stabbing, with her nerves failing her in crucial moments. Seles was also known for accompanying her shots with loud grunting, and was the first player in the women’s game to do so, and was frequently criticized for doing so. Due to her aggressive power game, strong serve, and grunting, she is considered the inspiration for modern WTA players such as Serena and Venus Williams, Maria Sharapova, and Victoria Azarenka.

Coaches, equipment and endorsements

Seles had many coaches through the years. These included: Karoly Seleš (1979–1996), Jelena Genčić (1980–1986), Nick Bollettieri (1986–1990), Sven Groeneveld (1991–1992), Gavin Hopper (1997–1998), Bobby Banck (1999–2001), Mike Sell (2001–2002), and David Nainkin (2003).

In the early 1990s, Seles signed a $4-million endorsement contract with Fila to promote its footwear and tennis apparel. She used a Prince original graphite racquet on court. In August of the 1990 season, Seles switched to a Yonex racquet.

When she returned to the tour in 1995 after the stabbing sabbatical, Seles wore apparel by Nike and used a Yonex racquet on court.

In the 2000s, Seles wore apparel by Yonex and used Yonex SRQ Ti-800 Pro Long racquet on court.

Personal life
Seles was born and raised in Novi Sad, Yugoslavia (now Serbia) to an ethnic Hungarian family. She became a naturalized American citizen in 1994 and also received Hungarian citizenship in June 2007.

On April 21, 2009, Seles released her memoir Getting A Grip: On My Body, My Mind, My Self which chronicles her bout with depression and binge eating disorder (BED) after her stabbing, her father's cancer diagnosis and eventual death, her journey back to the game and a life beyond tennis.

Seles is married to businessman Tom Golisano, who is 32 years her senior. They began dating in 2009. The two announced their engagement on June 5, 2014.

As of 2015, Seles is a paid spokesperson for Shire Pharmaceuticals, the makers of the first drug approved by the Food and Drug Administration to treat BED, to raise awareness of the disorder she has suffered from since she was a young adult. Seles would eat normal amounts of food at meals, and then secretly eat large amounts of junk food when she was alone.

In popular culture
In 1993, Seinfeld featured an episode ("The Lip Reader") in which the creators fictionalized Seles's return to the US Open after her stabbing. In 1996, Seles made a guest appearance in the TV sitcom The Nanny. She also appeared in 2008 in the TV series Dancing with the Stars as one of the contestants.

Career statistics

Grand Slam singles finals: 13 finals (9 titles, 4 runner-ups)

Singles performance timeline

 Note: A walkover does not count as a win. Seles had a walkover in the second round of the US Open of 1996.

Records
 These records were attained in Open Era of tennis.
 Records in bold indicate peer-less achievements.

See also

WTA Tour records
Grand Slam (tennis)
List of WTA number 1 ranked singles tennis players
List of female tennis players
List of tennis tournaments
List of tennis rivalries
List of Grand Slam women's singles champions
Open Era tennis records – Women's singles
Tennis statistics
World number 1 women tennis players from 1883–present

Grunting in tennis

References

External links

 
 
 
 BBC Sport profile
 
 

1973 births
American female tennis players
American people of Hungarian descent
American victims of crime
Yugoslav emigrants to the United States
Australian Open (tennis) champions
Defectors to the United States
French Open champions
Hopman Cup competitors
Hungarians in Vojvodina
Serbian people of Hungarian descent
Living people
Olympic bronze medalists for the United States in tennis
People with acquired American citizenship
Sportspeople from Novi Sad
Sportspeople from Sarasota, Florida
Stabbing survivors
Serbian female tennis players
International Tennis Hall of Fame inductees
Tennis people from Florida
Tennis players at the 1996 Summer Olympics
Tennis players at the 2000 Summer Olympics
US Open (tennis) champions
Violence in sports
Yugoslav female tennis players
Grand Slam (tennis) champions in women's singles
Medalists at the 2000 Summer Olympics
Serbian expatriate sportspeople in the United States
Tennis controversies
Citizens of Hungary through descent
21st-century American women
WTA number 1 ranked singles tennis players
ITF World Champions